The 1981 European Wrestling Championships were held in the men's Freestyle style in Lodz Poland  23 – 26 April 1981; the Greco-Romane style in Gothenburg Sweden 8 – 11 April 1981.

Medal table

Medal summary

Men's freestyle

Men's Greco-Roman

References

External links
Fila's official championship website

Europe
W
European Wrestling Championships
Euro  
1981 in European sport
International sports competitions in Gothenburg
W
Euro
1980s in Gothenburg
Sports competitions in Łódź